State Route 76 (SR 76) is a state highway in Tennessee, traversing the state in a northeast-southwest axis from east of Memphis to north of Nashville. SR 76 is unique in that it actually changes its cardinal directions (from North-South to East-West) in Clarksville at the junction with US 41A and US 41A Bypass.

Route description

Fayette County

SR 76 begins as a primary highway in Fayette County in Moscow at a junction with SR 57, its southern terminus. The highway goes north as a 2-lane highway through countryside and wooded areas to the community of Williston and has a junction with SR 193. It then turns slight northeast before turning north again at the junction with SR 195 just south of Somerville. SR 76 then enters Somerville and passes through a neighborhood before entering downtown and intersecting US 64/SR 15. It then passes through another neighborhood before crossing the Loosahatchie River and leaving Somerville to have a Y-Intersection with SR 59 shortly there after, with SR 76 turning northeast once again while SR 59 branches off to the northwest.

Haywood County

SR 76 then enters Haywood County and immediately enters the small community of Dancyville and becomes concurrent with SR 179. They then split just before the first of two interchanges with I-40 (Exit 52). SR 76 then crosses the Hatchie River and has another interchange with I-40 (Exit 56) before reaching Brownsville. It then comes to an intersection with US 70/US 79/SR 1/SR 19 and becomes concurrent with that route. At this point SR 76 becomes unsigned. SR 19 breaks away to the east shortly afterwards and US 70/US 79/SR 1/SR 76 then follow a new bypass around downtown to an intersection with US 70A. US 79 and SR 76 then break away from US 70/SR 1 to follow US 70A and they then leave Brownsville going northeast just an intersection with SR 369. They then cross the South Fork of the Forked Deer River before crossing into Crockett County.

Crockett County

US 79/SR 76 then enter Bells shortly afterwards to have a short concurrency with SR 88. They then have an interchange with US 412/SR 20 before leaving bells and entering farmland. They pass through the community of Fruitvale and the town of Gadsden, where they intersect SR 221, before crossing the Middle Fork of the Forked Deer River into Gibson County and immediately enter Humboldt.

Gibson County

They have an interchange with a new bypass around downtown and begin to follow it, turning north and widening to a 4-lane highway, and have a junction with SR 152 immediately after the interchange. They then turn east and have an intersection with US 45W/SR 5 to become concurrent with that route. US 70A/US 79/SR 76 then break away from the bypass, and US 45W/SR 5, at another intersection shortly afterwards, leaving Humboldt and narrowing back to 2-lanes and has an intersection with SR 187 shortly afterwards. They go through farmland once again and pass through Gibson, having a junction with SR 186, before entering Milan and intersecting US 45E/SR 43/SR 77/SR 104, and becoming concurrent with SR 77. They then intersect SR 425 before leaving Milan and widening to a 4-lane divided highway for a short distance before narrowing back down to a 2-lane to cross into Carroll County.

Carroll County

They then enter Atwood and intersect SR 220 shortly before US 70A and SR 77 pull away, at a Y-Intersection, to the east, while SR 76 continues to follow US 79. US 79/SR 76 continue northeast and pass through Trezevant, intersecting SR 105, before entering McKenzie to pass just to the south of downtown and intersect SR 436, SR 124, and SR 423 before having an interchange with SR 22 to leave McKenzie and cross into Henry County shortly afterwards and widen to 4-lane divided highway once again.

Henry County

US 79/SR 76 then immediately passes through the town of Henry, bypassing it while the old alignment through town is now named Pioneer Road. They then continue northeast to intersect SR 218 (Paris Bypass) before entering Paris to junction with US 641/SR 69, bypassing downtown to the southeast. They then intersect SR 356 before going through a business district before leaving Paris at another intersection with SR 218 (Paris Bypass). They then pass through countryside and intersect SR 140 south of Buchanan before entering Paris Landing State Park and junctioning with SR 119 before crossing the Ned McWherter Memorial Bridge over Kentucky Lake/Tennessee River into Stewart County.

Stewart County

US 79/SR 76 then enter the Land Between the Lakes National Recreation Area and intersect with SR 232 and several park access roads, including the SR 461 (The Trace), before narrowing to 2-lanes to enter Dover and leaving the park. In downtown they intersect with SR 49 before leaving Dover by crossing the Cumberland River as a 2-lane highway. It then widens back to 4-lanes 1 mile later and turns southeast at the intersection with SR 120. They then junction with SR 46 north of Indian Mound before crossing into Montgomery County.

Montgomery County

They then turn northeast again before passing through Woodlawn and intersecting with SR 233. US 79/SR 76 then widen to 5-lanes at the interchange with SR 374 and enters Clarksville. SR 76 and US 79 then merge with US 41A/SR 12 after passing through some neighborhoods and come to an intersection with US 41A Bypass/SR 13 just north of downtown, where US 79 breaks away from SR 76 to follow SR 13 north to Kentucky and SR 12 branches away to follow US 41A Bypass. US 41A/SR 76 continue south into downtown as a 2-lane road (as North 2nd Street) before turning east onto College Street (SR 48) before turning south again on University Avenue (SR 112, becomes concurrent with and is unsigned) before again turning east to follow Madison Street as they exit downtown and enter neighborhoods. They then curve to the southeast and pass by several businesses and have another junction with SR 374 before SR 76 breaks away from US 41A/SR 112, at another intersection with US 41A Bypass, and goes northeast, exiting Clarksville and switching cardinal directions from north-south to east-west. For four miles (6 km) past this junction, SR 76 widens to a four lane divided highway. It then has an interchange with I-24 (exit 11) in Sango and then funnels down to a two lane road. It then passes through Port Royal and junctions with SR 238 before crossing Sulphur Fork Creek into Robertson County.

Robertson County

SR 76 continues northeast through farmland to enter Adams and come to an intersection with SR 256. The highway then turns left onto Church Street through downtown before coming to an intersection with US 41/SR 11. Here, while SR 76 turns east to become concurrent with US 41/SR 11, it becomes unsigned, and becomes a secondary highway. US 41/SR 11/SR 76 then leave Adams and goes south east and passes through Cedar Hill before entering Springfield and coming to an intersection with US 431/SR 65. US 41/SR 11/SR 76 turn south to become concurrent with US 431/SR 65 and enters downtown to come to another intersection with SR 49. SR 76 then leaves the concurrency to follow SR 49 east; leaving downtown and passes by a school before SR 76 breaks away from SR 49 just before leaving Springfield as it finally becoming signed once again. SR 76 goes through farmland before entering White House and having an interchange with I-65 (Exit 108) before entering downtown and having an intersection with SR 258. SR 76 then becomes concurrent with US 31W/SR 41, turning north, for approximately two-tenths of a mile before branching off to the east again.

Sumner County

At this point, SR 76 crosses in Sumner County and passes through some neighborhoods before leaving White House and going northeast through farmland once more.  It continues northeast to intersect with SR 25 at a 4-way stop before passing through New Deal. SR 76 then comes to an end as a secondary highway at an intersection with SR 109 just south of downtown Portland.

Major intersections

References

External links
 

076
Transportation in Fayette County, Tennessee
Transportation in Haywood County, Tennessee
Transportation in Crockett County, Tennessee
Transportation in Carroll County, Tennessee
Transportation in Henry County, Tennessee
Transportation in Stewart County, Tennessee
Transportation in Montgomery County, Tennessee
Transportation in Robertson County, Tennessee
Transportation in Sumner County, Tennessee